The second season of Baldwin Hills premiered on June 24, 2008 and concluded on August 19, 2008.

Cast
The following is a list of the cast members for the 2nd season.

  Main Cast Member
  Secondary Cast Member

Episodes

References

2008 American television seasons